Rareș Enceanu (born 5 August 1994) is a Romanian footballer who plays as a midfielder for CSA Steaua București.

Club career
Enceanu made his Liga I debut on 23 March 2012 in a 1–0 defeat of Rapid București. He injured his thigh after opening the scoring for the Romanian under-19 team against Cyprus under-19s in April. Named in FC Brașov's starting eleven to face Dinamo București just three weeks later, he suffered a recurrence of the injury after only six minutes of the match, and did not return to training until mid-August.

Honours
CSA Steaua București
Liga III: 2020–21
Liga IV: 2019–20

Career statistics

Club

Statistics accurate as of match played 29 May 2017

Honours

Club
FCSB:
Romanian Liga I: 2014–15
Cupa României: 2014–15
Romanian League Cup: 2014–15, 2015–16

References
General

Infobox statistics: 

Specific

1994 births
Living people
Romanian footballers
Association football midfielders
Liga I players
Liga II players
FC Brașov (1936) players
FC Steaua București players
FC Voluntari players
FC Argeș Pitești players
CSA Steaua București footballers